The Young Socialist Alliance (YSA) was a Trotskyist youth group of the Socialist Workers Party (SWP) in the United States of America. It was founded in 1960, although it had roots going back several years earlier. It was dissolved in 1992. The membership peaked in 1971 at 1,434.



History
The origins of the YSA were in a regroupment of younger members of the SWP with others in the aftermath of the Hungarian Revolution of 1956. The principal other component was a group from the Young Socialist League, the youth group of an adult organization called the Independent Socialist League, led by Max Shachtman. The principal figures from the YSL were Tim Wohlforth, Shane Mage, and James Robertson, who joined with young members of the SWP (hence the word "alliance") to found the "Young Socialist"  newspaper. A founding conference of the Young Socialist Alliance was held in April 1960 in Philadelphia, Pennsylvania, though local Young Socialist supporter groups had existed in several cities for a few years beforehand.
The initial YSA central leadership was comprised two rival groups: Wohlforth, Robertson, and Mage who had come over from the YSL, and SWP majority supporters represented by Nora Roberts, Bert Deck, and others. In late 1961 at the second YSA convention, held in Chicago, the SWP central leadership arranged the removal of Wohlforth and Robertson from the YSA on age grounds and replaced the initial majority group with Barry Sheppard and Peter Camejo from Boston, Sheppard as national chairman and Camejo as national secretary. At that time the Young Socialist Alliance had approximately 150 members nationally

An early activity of the YSA was a national campaign in defense of three of its members who were students at Indiana University in Bloomington, Indiana, Tom Morgan, Ralph Levitt, and Jim Bingham, who were indicted in 1963 by local prosecutor Thomas Hoadley under a little used anticommunist statute. The students were eventually acquitted.

At the YSA's fourth convention, held over the 1964-65 New Year weekend in Chicago, Jack Barnes succeeded Barry Sheppard as YSA national chairman. Barnes had joined the SWP in Minneapolis while a student at Carleton College in Minnesota. He in turn recruited a number of fellow students, including several who went on to become prominent in the Socialist Workers Party leadership of the next two decades.

The YSA achieved substantial influence in the anti-Vietnam War movement between 1965 and the early 1970s, including near complete control over the Student Mobilization Committee to End the War in Vietnam, a national campus organization with a peak membership of some 100,000.

The organization went into rapid decline with the end of the war in Vietnam in 1975. By 1980 its membership had fallen to 468, of whom only about 275 were not also members of the Socialist Workers Party. The YSA formally dissolved in 1992. Two years later the Socialist Workers Party created a new youth organization called the Young Socialists.

References

External links
Young Socialist archive on the Encyclopedia of Trotskyism On-Line
The Young Socialist Alliance records at the University of Maryland Libraries 
University of Washington Libraries Digital Collections - Vietnam War Era Ephemera This collection contains leaflets and newspapers that were distributed on the University of Washington campus during the decades of the 1960s and 1970s. Includes ephemera from the Young Socialist Alliance.

Defunct Trotskyist organizations in the United States
Youth wings of communist parties
Youth wings of political parties in the United States